Mat (matershchina / materny yazyk) is the term for vulgar, obscene, or profane language in Russian and some other Slavic language communities. The term mat derives from the Russian word for mother, a component of the key phrase "Ёб твою мать", "yob tvoyu mat (fuck your mother).

Four pillars of mat 
In 2014, Roskomnadzor compiled a list of four lexical roots, with any words derived from these roots - nouns, adjectives, verbs, participles etc - of the Russian language which it deemed "absolutely unacceptable in the mass media": khuy ("cock"); pizda ("cunt"); yebat ("to fuck"); and blyad ("whore"). Since Roskomnadzor is the governmental agency legally entitled to make such decisions, this is exactly the currently active Russian legal definition of "mat".

David Remnick believes that mat has thousands of variations but ultimately centers on those four words.

All mat-words were included by Polish publisher Jan Baudouin de Courtenay in the 3rd and 4th editions of the Explanatory Dictionary of the Living Great Russian Language, which was printed four times in 1903–1909 (twice) and in 1911–1912, 1912–1914. The inclusion of rude and abusive words became an obstacle to the reprinting of this version of the dictionary in the Soviet Union for censorship reasons.

Slavic languages, including Russian, are very rich in terms of word formation by adding prefixes and suffixes. For instance, in Russian, usually, the perfect form of a verb is created from its imperfect form by adding a prefix like "na-", "ot-", "s-" etc (i.e. "delat'" - "to do", "sdelat'" - "to have done"). This richness also occurs with "mat" too, thus some Russians claim that Russian language is extremely rich in its "mat", and perhaps the world's richest language in terms of obscene/profane lexicon.

Khuy 
Khuy, often also written in Latin as "hui" or even "hooy" by Russian schoolchildren/beginners in their English studies, means cock, penis, or for an equivalent colloquial register: dick. The etymology of the term is unclear. Mainstream theories include from Proto-Indo European (PIE) *ks-u-, related to хвоя (khvoya, "pine needles"), attributed to Pederson, 1908. 

From PIE *hau-, related to хвост (khvost, "tail"), attributed to Merlingen, 1955; from Mongolian хуй (khui, meaning "sheath" or "scabbard"). This was the etymology endorsed by the Soviet government and attributed to Maxim Gorky, who claimed it was a loan word, imposed during the Mongol yoke. Alexander Gorokhovski suggests the derivation from the Latin huic (lit. "for that", used on prescriptions for genital diseases) as a euphemism, because the old Russian "ud/uda" (from PIE root *ud- meaning "up, out") became taboo in the mid-18th century. 

Another theory is that it originates from the Greek word huios, which means son. Currently, the first volume of the Great Dictionary of Mat by the Russian linguist and folklorist Alexei Plutser-Sarno treats only expressions with the stem хуй (khuy), numbering over 500 entries; 12 volumes are planned. The word khuy also appears in various other Slavic languages with the same meaning and pronunciation but not always the same spelling, such as the Polish chuj.

Pizda 
Pizdá means cunt.

Yebát' 
Yebát (lat. futuere) means "to fuck", "to copulate", "to have intercourse".

Blyád'  

Blyád''' means whore. In the Old East Slavic the word блѧдь (блядь in modern orthography) – blyad, meaning: "deception, nonsense, insane, adulteress", is preserved in the Church Slavonic in three meanings: "deception, delusion", "idle talk, trivia" and "debauchery, adultery".

The word is often combined with the non-mat term "suka" (bitch) to form "suka, blyád" (сука, блядь) especially among Internet users and memes, an approximate analogue for the expression "fucking shit". The term is very popular in the Counter-Strike video game community in the stylized form of "rush B, cyka blyat".

 History and use 
Obscenities are among the earliest recorded attestations of the Russian language (the first written mat words date to the Middle Ages).

Mikhail Lermontov's 1834 "A Holiday in Peterhof" ("Петергофский праздник") is one example of the usage of mat.

{| border="0" align="center" width="80%"
|-
| width="30%" | And so I will not pay you:
However, if you are a simple whore
You should consider it an honor
To be acquainted with the cadet's dick!
| width="30%" lang="ru"| Итак, тебе не заплачу я:
Но если ты простая блядь,
То знай: за честь должна считать
Знакомство юнкерского хуя!
| width="30%" | <poem>Iták, tebé ne zaplachú ya:
No yésli ty prostáya blyad',
To znay: za chest' dolzhná schitát'
Znakómstvo yúnkerskogo khúya!</poem>
|}

The prologue to Luka Mudishchev, probably written at some time in the mid 19th century, was often ascribed to Ivan Barkov, an obscene poet who lived in the 18th century:Mat is also used in humor or puns by juxtaposing innocent words so that the result will sound as if an obscene word was used. An example is a Cossack song cited in And Quiet Flows the Don (1928–1940) by Mikhail Sholokhov:
Щуку я, щуку я, щуку я поймала.
Девица красная, уху я варила.
Уху я, уху я, уху я варила. 
Here "Уху я варила" ("I cooked the fish stew") may be reinterpreted as "У хуя варила" ("Cooked near the dick") or even "Ух, хуй я варила" ("Ooh, I cooked a dick").

The contemporaneous use of mat is widespread, especially in the army, police, blue-collar workers, the criminal world, and many other all-male milieus. An article by Victor Erofeyev (translated by Andrew Bromfeld) analyzing the history, overtones, and sociology of mat appeared in the 15 September 2003 issue of The New Yorker.

During the Russian attack on Snake Island on 24 February 2022, the last communication made by the Ukrainian border guard Roman Hrybov to the Russian missile cruiser Moskva used mat: "Русский военный корабль, иди нахуй" ("Russian warship, go fuck yourself", literally translated as "Russian warship, go to a dick").

Legal issues
, mat has been banned in Russia from all movies, theatrical productions, and concerts. In modern Russia, the use of mat is censored in the media and the use of mat in public constitutes petty hooliganism, a form of disorderly conduct, punishable under article 20.1.1 of the Offences Code of Russia, although there is no clear legal definition what exactly constitutes "mat". Despite the public ban, mat is used by Russians of all ages and nearly all social groups, with particular fervor in the male-dominated military and the structurally similar social strata.

 See also 
 Fenya
 Gopnik
 Grass Mud Horse (Chinese equivalent)
 Motherfucker
 Putin khuylo!
 Russian joke: Taboo vocabulary
 Russian warship, go fuck yourself
 Seven dirty words
 Leningrad, a Russian ska/punk band famous for its vulgar lyrics
 Sektor Gaza, a Russian metaironic horror hard-rock band famous for its vulgar lyric

 Notes 

 External links 

Русский мат с Алексеем Плуцером-Сарно – online version of the Dictionary of Russian Mat by Alexei Plutser-Sarno 
Russian slang explained in English, French and German
Cited portions of a The New Yorker article.
The unique power of Russia's underground language, The New Yorker'' via russki-mat.net
'Dead Man's Bluff' by Mikhail Volokhov. Director Andrei Zhitinkin. First play in Russia to be written entirely in profanities. Productions of this play have always been surrounded by controversy: in Russia by Andrei Zhitinkin, with actors Oleg Fomin and Sergei Chonishvili; in France by Bernard Sobel with actors Denis Lavant and Hugues Quester; in Germany and Switzerland the parts were played in French and German by Armin Rohde and Roberto Guerra.

Russian slang
Sexual slang
Russian words and phrases